Kuwait competed at the 2020 Summer Paralympics in Tokyo, Japan, from 24 August to 5 September 2021.

Medalists

Athletics 

Ahmad Almutairi (100m T33), successfully to break through the qualifications for the 2020 Paralympics after breaking the qualification limit. He won the silver medal in the men's 100 metres T33 event.

Faisal Sorour won the bronze medal in the men's shot put F63 event.

References 

2020
Nations at the 2020 Summer Paralympics